Saint-Amand-Magnazeix (Limousin: Sent Amand Manhasés) is a commune in the Haute-Vienne department in the Nouvelle-Aquitaine region in west-central France.

Geography
The river Semme forms part of the commune's eastern and southern borders.

See also
Communes of the Haute-Vienne department

References

Communes of Haute-Vienne